Kostrza may refer to the following places in Poland:
Kostrza, Lower Silesian Voivodeship (south-west Poland)
Kostrza, Lesser Poland Voivodeship (south Poland)